KNCP-LP (107.3 FM) is a radio station licensed to serve the community of La Pine, Oregon. The station is owned by Lapine Frontier Days Association and airs a variety format.

The station was assigned the call sign KITG-LP by the Federal Communications Commission on February 7, 2014. The station changed its call sign to KNCP-LP on March 6, 2014.

References

External links
 Official Website
 

NCP-LP
NCP-LP
Radio stations established in 2015
2015 establishments in Oregon
Variety radio stations in the United States
Deschutes County, Oregon